Michele Joy Leggott  (born 1956) is a New Zealand poet, and an emeritus professor of English at the University of Auckland. She was the New Zealand Poet Laureate between 2007 and 2009.

Biography
Leggott was born in Stratford, New Zealand, and received her secondary education at New Plymouth Girls' High School, before attending the University of Canterbury where she completed an MA in English in 1979. She then moved to Canada to do a PhD at the University of British Columbia. Her dissertation was on the American poet Louis Zukofsky and was published as Reading Zukofsky’s 80 Flowers (1989).

Leggott began publishing her poetry around 1980. She published Sound Pitch Considered Forms with two Canadian poets in 1984. In 1985 she returned to New Zealand and took up a lectureship at the University of Auckland. She produced her first book of poems, Like This?, in 1988, winning the International PEN First Book of Poetry award.

In her collection of poetry, "As Far as I Can See" (Auckland University Press, 1999), Leggott wrote about her deep sorrow at losing her sight - she began going blind in 1985. Leggott was awarded a Blind Achievers Award by the Foundation for the Blind in 1999 for her work on "The Book of Nadath".

In 1991 she published Swimmers, Dancers, with a domestic focus, and in 1995 she won the New Zealand Book Award for Poetry with DIA. On 4 December 2007, she was named New Zealand Poet Laureate for 2008/2009.

Her work has appeared in the Best New Zealand Poems series in 2002 and 2005.

In the 2009 New Year Honours, Leggott was appointed a Member of the New Zealand Order of Merit, for services to poetry.

Personal life
Michele is married to Mark Fryer, and they have 2 adult sons.

Honours and awards

 2008/09 New Zealand Poet Laureate 
2013 Prime Minister's Awards for Literary Achievement

Works

Poetry
 1988: Like This?: Poems. Christchurch: Caxton Press
 1991: Swimmers, Dancers. Auckland: Auckland University Press
 1994: DIA. Auckland: Auckland University Press
 1999: As far as I can see. Auckland: Auckland University Press
 2005: Milk & Honey. Auckland: Auckland University Press
 2006: Journey to Portugal. Images by Gretchen Albrecht. Auckland: Holloway Press
 2009: Mirabile Dictu. Auckland: Auckland University Press
 2014 Heartland. Auckland: Auckland University Press
 2017 Vanishing Points. Auckland: Auckland University Press
 2020 (March) Mezzaluna. Auckland: Auckland University Press; first published by Wesleyan University Press, US

Editor
 1989: Reading Zukofsky's 80 Flowers, Baltimore: Johns Hopkins University Press
 1995: The Victory Hymn, 1935-1995, by Robin Hyde; with an essay by Michele Leggott; Auckland: Holloway Press 
 1995: Opening the Book : New Essays on New Zealand Writing, Edited by Mark Williams and Michele Leggott; Auckland: Auckland University Press 
 1999: The book of Nadath, by Robin Hyde; introduction and notes by Michele Leggott; Auckland: Auckland University Press
 2000: Big Smoke: New Zealand Poems 1960-1975, edited by Alan Brunton, Murray Edmond, Michele Leggott; Auckland: Auckland University Press
 2003: Young Knowledge: the poems of Robin Hyde, edited and introduced by Michele Leggott; Auckland: Auckland University Press

References

External links
New Zealand Book Council: Profile
New Zealand Electronic Poetry Centre: Online works and articles

1956 births
Living people
Members of the New Zealand Order of Merit
New Zealand poets
New Zealand women poets
New Zealand Poets Laureate
People from Stratford, New Zealand
Academic staff of the University of Auckland
University of British Columbia alumni
University of Canterbury alumni
People educated at New Plymouth Girls' High School